OHS may refer to:

Medicine 
 Obesity hypoventilation syndrome
 Occipital horn syndrome

Other 
 Occupational safety and health
 Occupational Health Science, a scholarly journal published by the Society for Occupational Health Psychology
 Oh's, a brand of cereals
 Oracle HTTP Server
 Over head system, a power supply scheme for bumper cars

Organizations 
 Ochsner Health System
 Office of Homeland Security, Office of the Executive Branch of the United States, precursor to the Department of Homeland Security
 Ohio Historical Society
 Oklahoma Historical Society
 Ontario Handweavers & Spinners
 Oregon Historical Society
 Organ Historical Society, in Villanova, Pennsylvania, United States
 Ottawa Humane Society
 Oxford Harmonic Society

High schools 
 Various countries
 Orange High School (disambiguation), various schools of this name
 Olympic High School (disambiguation), various schools of this name 

 Canada
 Oromocto High School, in Oromocto, New Brunswick

 New Zealand
 Onehunga High School, in Auckland

 United Kingdom
 Oriel High School, in Crawley, West Sussex, England
 Oxford High School, in Oxford, Oxfordshire, England

 United States
 Oakland High School, in Oakland, California
 Oakmont High School, in Antelope, California
 Oakton High School, in Vienna, Virginia
 Oceanside High School, in Oceanside, California
 Odessa High School (New York), in Odessa, New York
 Odessa High School, in Odessa, Texas
 Odessa High School (Washington), in Odessa, Washington
 Ogden High School (Utah), in Ogden, Utah
 Olympian High School, in San Diego County, California
 Olympic High School, in Charlotte, North Carolina
 Opelika High School, in Opelika, Alabama
 Orem High School, in Orem, Utah
 Orion High School, in Orion, Illinois
 Osborne High School, in Marietta, Georgia
 Ottawa Senior High School, in Ottawa, Kansas
 Ottumwa High School, in Ottumwa, Iowa
 Stanford University Online High School, online school based in Stanford, California
Oswego High School, in Oswego Illinois
Oswego High School, in Oswego, New York